This list includes organisms whose common or scientific names are drawn from indigenous languages of the Americas. When the common name of the organism in English derives from an indigenous language of the Americas, it is given first.

In biological nomenclature, organisms receive scientific names, which are formally in Latin, but may be drawn from any language and many have incorporated words from indigenous language of the Americas. These scientific names are generally formally published in peer-reviewed journal articles or larger monographs along with descriptions of the named taxa and ways to distinguish them from other taxa.

List

References

indigenous
Taxonomy (biology)
Taxonomic lists
Indigenous languages of the Americas